Ujazd may refer to the following towns in Poland:
Ujazd, Gniezno County in Greater Poland Voivodeship (west-central Poland)
Ujazd, Grodzisk Wielkopolski County in Greater Poland Voivodeship (west-central Poland)
Ujazd, Kuyavian-Pomeranian Voivodeship (north-central Poland)
Ujazd, Bochnia County in Lesser Poland Voivodeship (south Poland)
Ujazd, Kraków County in Lesser Poland Voivodeship (south Poland)
Ujazd, Poddębice County in Łódź Voivodeship (central Poland)
Ujazd, Tomaszów Mazowiecki County in Łódź Voivodeship (central Poland)
Ujazd, Lower Silesian Voivodeship (south-west Poland)
Ujazd, Zgorzelec in Lower Silesian Voivodeship (south-west Poland)
Ujazd, Opole Voivodeship (south Poland)
Ujazd, Świętokrzyskie Voivodeship (south-central Poland)
Ujazd, Subcarpathian Voivodeship (south-east Poland)
Ujazd, Białogard County in West Pomeranian Voivodeship (north-west Poland)
Ujazd, Koszalin County in West Pomeranian Voivodeship (north-west Poland)
Ujazd, Polish name for Uhyst (east Germany)